Headstone Lane is a railway station near Headstone, in the London Borough of Harrow. The station is in Travelcard Zone 5.

Services
The typical off-peak service is four trains per hour to London Euston, and four trains to Watford Junction, calling at all stations. The trains to Watford Junction are northbound and are accessed through a gateway and by going down a flight of stairs, whereas the other platform is southbound and is directed towards London Euston. This is accessed by crossing over a bridge and also going down a flight of stairs to reach the platform. On the northbound platform, there is a gate exit which now has an Oyster reader, so passengers can exit through the gate without having to climb the stairs. There are also Oyster readers at the main entrance at the top of the bridge. During the Silverlink era, the gate was rarely opened – however in recent times, London Overground always leaves the gate open.

The station was previously also served by the Bakerloo line of the London Underground between 16 April 1917 and 24 September 1982.

Since the takeover of this station from Silverlink to London Overground the ticket office opening hours have significantly improved and two ticket machines have been installed which now offer Oyster Cards facilities, card payments are also accepted.
{{subst:#invoke:adjacent stations|convert|

Connections

London Buses routes H18 and H19 serve the station.

References

External links

Railway stations in the London Borough of Harrow
DfT Category E stations
Former London and North Western Railway stations
Railway stations in Great Britain opened in 1913
Railway stations served by London Overground
Proposed London Underground stations
1913 establishments in England